Jio Pagla (Bengali: জিও পাগলা Jiō Pāglā) is a 2017 Indian Bengali comedy film directed by Ravi Kinagi.

The film was based on the Bengali movie Joy Maa Kali Boarding (which was based on the play of same name) and which was an inspiration for the Hindi movie Biwi Aur Makan (1966), Marathi movie Ashi Hi Banwa Banwi (1989), Telugu movie Chitram Bhalare Vichitram (1991), two Kannada movies - Bombat Hendthi (1992) and Olu Saar Bari Olu (2003), Tamil movie Aanazhagan (1995), Punjabi movie Mr & Mrs 420 (2014) and Hindi movie Paying Guests (2009).

Plot
Ananta, Sujoy, Ananda and Rajasaunkar Dhol who were very close friends from childhood. Ananta, a fashion photographer lived in a rented house, which is owned by Khagen Mal. 
His three friends lived at their native place. Ananda has to come to Kolkata and live with Ananta for his job at Kolkata. After that, Sujoy came to Kolkata for interview for the Dance Paglu Dance and Rajsaunkar came to Kolkata being chased from his work in theaters. In a dramatic turn of events, all the friends are forced to live together at Ananta's rented home. One day Khogen catches them red-handed doing mischief with his third wife, Tola Boudi and forces them to vacate the house. After a lot of searching they found a home where they could at least live but they needed family. So they decided that Sujoy and Dhol have to pretend to be Ananda's and Ananta's wife. Gradually they everyone got their girlfriends, found their girlfriends having relation to the members of the same house and by some turn of events they all got to know everything. But Nepal Khan, the leader Nepal Khan bn Complex, associating with Khagen Mal, kidnapped them and threatened the family members to sign, for that he could complete his building project. The team of four friends reached there and fought with them and while fighting all makeups were removed and the family members also got to know about it. After all of the winning, they apologized to them and the family happily forgived them and appreciated them.

Cast
Jisshu Sengupta as Ananta
Soham Chakraborty as Rajshankar Dhol aka Gouri
Hiran Chatterjee as Ananda
Bonny Sengupta as Sujoy aka Sumona
Srabanti Chatterjee as Priya
Payel Sarkar as Nandita aka Nodi
Rittika Sen as Sashikala
Koushani Mukherjee as Monalisa
Supriyo Dutta as Khagen Mal, owner of the house

Ambarish Bhattacharya as Nepal Khal
Anuradha Roy as Nayantara Devi
Biswajit Chakraborty as Landlord
Kanchan Mallick as Sashikala's uncle
Sharmila Das as Shasikala's Aunt
Barna Raha
Rimjhim Mitra as Judge
Rabi Kinnagi as Judge
Masud Rana as Judge

Soundtrack

References

External links
 

Bengali-language Indian films
2010s Bengali-language films
Bengali remakes of Hindi films
Bengali remakes of Marathi films
Cross-dressing in Indian films
Films scored by Jeet Ganguly